was a private junior college in Akashi, Hyogo, Japan.

History 
The college was founded in 1967 as Akashi Women's Junior College with the Department of Clothing Science. It became coeducational in 1969 and was renamed Akashi Junior College . In 1970 it added the departments of Design and Liberal Arts. After the Michiyo Okabe (岡部 三千代 Okabe Michiyo, 18-year-old Akashi Junior College girl) nude murder case, 
it was renamed Kobe College of Liberal Arts in 1990.

In 2008 the college was merged into Kobe University of Fashion and Design and renamed Kobe College of Fashion and Design.

External links 
 Official Website (Japanese; WebArchive on 7 March 2006)

See also 
 Junior college

References 

Art schools in Japan
Universities and colleges in Hyōgo Prefecture